Ftelia is a beach on the island of Mykonos, Greece. Its northern location has established the beach as a windsurfer's paradise, as there is almost always a strong wind blowing. The beach is also well known for the famous neolithic settlement found there that is believed to be the tomb of ancient Iliad war hero Ajax the Locrian.  Ftelia is an isolated, very tranquil place and even during the busy Mykonos months of July and August it is not very crowded because it is often quite windy and dusty.

Beaches of Greece
Landforms of Mykonos
Landforms of the South Aegean
Populated places in Mykonos